Stadion Krimeja is a football stadium in the Croatian city of Rijeka. It is named after the Krimeja neighbourhood where it is located. The stadium has served as the home ground for HNK Orijent since 1923. The capacity of the stadium is 3,500.

References

External links
Stadion Krimeja at HNK Orijent 1919 official website 
Stadion Krimeja at RijekaSport.hr 

Sports venues in Rijeka
Football venues in Croatia
HNK Orijent
Sports venues completed in 1923
Buildings and structures in Primorje-Gorski Kotar County
1923 establishments in Italy